Camille Lembi Zaneli (April 2, 1950July 8, 2011) was the bishop of the Roman Catholic Diocese of Isangi, Democratic Republic of the Congo.

Zaneli was born on April 2, 1950, in Zongo, Belgian Congo. Ordained to the priesthood on September 30, 1979, He worked in seminaries in Kananga and Kinshasa. He also served as a parish priest for two parishes in Martinique in 1999.

He was appointed the bishop of Isangi by Pope John Paul II on June 17, 2000.

Death
Bishop Zaneli was killed in the crash of Hewa Bora Airways Flight 952 at Bangoka International Airport, Kisangani, on July 8, 2011. He was 61 years old.

Notes

1950 births
2011 deaths
People from Sud-Ubangi
21st-century Roman Catholic bishops in the Democratic Republic of the Congo
Victims of aviation accidents or incidents in the Democratic Republic of the Congo
Roman Catholic bishops of Isangi
21st-century Democratic Republic of the Congo people